William Jordyn (died 1602) was an English politician.

He was a Member (MP) of the Parliament of England for Shaftesbury in 1563.

References

16th-century births
1602 deaths

Year of birth unknown
English MPs 1563–1567